, subtitled The Flowers of Hard Blood, is a Japanese manga series written by Masaru Katori and illustrated by Jiro Ando. It is published by Kodansha in the seinen manga magazine Monthly Afternoon, and is collected in eight bound volumes. It has been adapted as a twenty-two episode anime television series by Studio Deen, which aired in Japan between October 2007 and March 2008. A video game for the Nintendo DS was released on April 10, 2008, by Mainichi Communications.

Plot
Shion no Ō centers around a young junior-high school girl named Shion Yasuoka who had witnessed the murder of her parents as a small child. At the time of the murder, the killer takes the king piece from her father's shogi board (a Japanese strategy board game similar to chess). This leads her to believe that the murderer may be a shogi player. The shock of the tragic incident renders Shion unable to speak, forcing her to communicate by writing on a note pad. After being adopted by her neighbors, the Yasuoka family (where the husband is also a shogi player), Shion takes up the game herself, both for the love of the game and to possibly learn of the person who had killed her parents.

Characters

Shion Yasuoka, formerly  before adoption, is the main protagonist of the story. When she was five years old, Shion's parents were slaughtered in their own home, though the murderer was never found. Shion, being a young girl at the time, was traumatized by bearing witness to the aftermath and since then has been mute. To communicate, she writes down everything on a notepad. At the murder scene, Shion found a king shogi piece and later comes to suspect that the culprit plays the game.

When the story begins, Shion is thirteen and is in junior-high school. She loves sweets, though chocolate is her favorite. Due to her foster father's influence, Shion eventually starts to play shogi which she hopes will give her clues about the murder of her parents. Throughout the series, she only talks through internal monologue until the final episode where she regains her voice and is able to speak.

A keen and perceptive man who abandoned his brother after their mother's death to become a professional player himself. It is revealed near the end of the series that he is the one that killed Shion's parents, because he was interested in seeing what kind of professional Shogi player Shion would become, but this caused conflict with her father, who did not want his daughter to play professional Shogi. He was defeated in a match by Shion and arrested immediately afterwards, but not before remarking that Shion had the "eyes of a pro".

Satoru is Makoto's younger brother and works as a businessman. Aside from that, he is also a gifted shogi player himself, who dreams to one day defeat his brother in an official match. His girlfriend was working with Shion's dead parents, and mysteriously died one day after them.

Ayumi is a fifteen-year-old male shogi player. Due to his sickly mother, he had to leave high school to take care of her and pay for her hospital bills. When playing shogi, he pretends to be a girl in order to earn money for competing; due to the male league taking two years to qualify. In the anime, after episode sixteen, he plays as a boy. Progressively through the series, he seems to care very much about Shion, saying that he wants to protect her. Many people often tease him about being Shion's boyfriend, causing him to become embarrassed. When he plays against Satoru, Meijin's younger brother, he reveals that his father was once a shogi player.

Saori is a female shogi player and apprentice to Makoto. She is eighteen years old, and a fan of Shion.  As befitting the daughter of a high-class family, her type of shougi is usually dignified.  She deeply seeks recognition from Makoto, who she looks up to.

Shinji is Shion's foster father and is a professional shogi player. His rank is 8 dan.

}
Sachiko is Shion's foster mother. A strict but caring woman who ever supports her daughter and husband, despite not always agreeing with them.

A secluded 9-dan shogi player. Despite his grumpy exterior earning him the nickname "demon," Kamizono seems to have a kind spirit, as he not only accepted Ayumi as his apprentice, even after discovering his secret, but also lent some money to Shinji when he decided to adopt Shion.  He's implied to place a great deal of value in family, refusing a disciple who abandoned his brother to learn from him but accepting one who would do anything to save his mother.

Tooru is Shinji's apprentice.

Media

Manga
The manga of Shion no Ō is written by Masaru Katori and illustrated by Jiro Ando. It was serialized between the May 2004 and June 2008 issues of the Japanese seinen manga magazine Monthly Afternoon published by Kodansha. Eight bound volumes were published in Japan.

Anime
The anime adaptation of Shion no Ō produced by Studio Deen and directed by Toshifumi Kawase aired in Japan from October 13, 2007, to March 22, 2008, on the Fuji TV television network. The opening theme is "Lady Love" by Rize and the ending theme is "My Dear Friend" by Thelma Aoyama.

Video game
An adventure video game based on the series was released by Mainichi Communications for the Nintendo DS on April 10, 2008.

References

External links
 

2004 manga
Mystery anime and manga
Seinen manga
Shogi in anime and manga
Studio Deen